Huang Hong-cheng（） is a Taiwanese performance artist, a social activist and a perennial candidate in Taiwanese elections. Born Huang Hong-cheng（）, he has been well-known for renaming himself multiple times. He once had the longest name in Taiwan, but the record was broken by a YouTuber, who changed his name in June 2020.

Since 2010, he has run in Taiwanese elections, but has yet to be elected to office.

References

Living people
1968 births
Taiwanese performance artists
Taiwanese activists
Soochow University (Taiwan) alumni